The predatory carp (Chanodichthys erythropterus), also known as the redfin culter or skygazer, is a species of ray-finned fish in the genus Chanodichthys. This East Asian freshwater cyprinid ranges from the Amur River south to Taiwan and the Red River, as well as Lake Buir in Mongolia.

References 

Chanodichthys
Fish described in 1855
Taxa named by Stepan Ivanovich Basilewsky